Emily Borthwick (born 2
September 1997, Worthing, West Sussex) is a British high jumper.

From Wigan, Greater Manchester Borthwick finished third at the 2020 British Championship in the high jump. In March 2021, she was selected for the Great Britain and Northern Ireland team to compete at the 2021 European Athletics Indoor Championships, held in Toruń, Poland. At the event she secured a new personal best with a third-time clearance at 1.91m to qualify for the final of the women’s high jump where she finished 8th. Her current PB is 1.95m set at The Bronze World Tour event in Hustopece, Czech Republic in Feb 2022.

After again finishing third in the British championships in 2021 Borthwick was added to the British squad for the delayed 2020 Summer Games in Tokyo. Borthwick finished 16th in the Olympic qualifying round equalling her previous lifetime best of 1.93m in the process.

Personal life
In November 2021, Borthwick lost her brother Connor Borthwick who was killed in an industrial accident in Blackburn, Lancashire.

References

1997 births
Living people
Sportspeople from Wigan
English female high jumpers
British female high jumpers
Olympic female high jumpers
Olympic athletes of Great Britain
Athletes (track and field) at the 2020 Summer Olympics
21st-century British women